Art Apart Fair is Singapore's first hotel-based boutique art fair. Initially called Worlds Apart Fair in January 2013, the success of the fair encouraged a second edition, later renamed as Art Apart Fair as part of a series of "Apart Fairs".

Art Apart coincides with Singapore Art Week, an initiative launched by the National Arts Council, along with the Singapore Tourism Board and Singapore Economic Development Board.

The fairs take place twice biannually – during January and July – in Singapore. Art Apart made its international debut in London in October 2014 at the Town Hall Hotel. It will be setting its stage in New York in October 2016.

Art Apart Fair serves as a platform to provide support towards emerging artists with the potential to become established. The fair gives artists the opportunity to showcase their works and gain recognition among art lovers and collectors. In January 2014, some 33 galleries and 1,500 artists' work from countries such as Taiwan, China, Australia, Kazakhstan, Croatia, Japan, Vietnam, Austria, Cambodia, South Korea, Russia, Spain and Germany, were featured.

Some of the galleries that have exhibited with Art Apart are South Korea's Seoul Arts Centre, Shanghai's Nancy Gallery, Madrid's Jorge & Fernando Alcolea Gallery and Russia's Gallery 11.12.

In comparison to other art fairs, Art Apart focuses on selecting galleries with emerging artists with a possibility of becoming established in their national or international market.

Due to the high costs of exhibiting at art fairs and the presence of many artists struggling to succeed financially, there is an "Adopt An Artist" initiative, where a Patron of the Arts and sponsors help to fund these artists. Galleries that are invited to showcase new works at Art Apart also help support the emerging artists by paying for the exhibiting fee. Works have to be new and not shown at other art fairs before.

Besides providing support for emerging artists, part of the revenue generated from the sales of art works and tickets goes towards helping the young and elderly in Singapore. One of the beneficiaries includes Halogen Foundation, an educational charity that helps to develop young leaders and entrepreneurs. Another beneficiary is the Lions Befrienders Service Association, Singapore's largest direct service voluntary welfare organisation, that assists the elderly and helps them engage with the community.

History 
The idea of holding an art fair in a hotel first originated in 1994 as the Gramercy International Art Fair in the rooms of Gramercy Park Hotel in New York City. The fair was highly successful, and it is now renamed "The Armory Show".

The concept of a hotel-based art fair breaks the conventional presentation of art in a whitewashed gallery space. Visitors are provided with a good idea of how these works would look like in a home setting, as they are being displayed in a more informal setting, such as on beds, table tops, chairs and even bathrooms.

Inspired by this layout, Art Apart founder and director Rosalind Lim decided to bring the idea over to Singapore. With over 38 years of experience in diverse fields, such as Public Relations, Branding, Marketing and Event Management, she built the foundation for the first successful hotel art fair – the Worlds Apart Fair in January 2013 at Conrad Centennial Singapore. The fair was later renamed Art Apart Fair and moved to Parkroyal on Pickering, where the entire 14th floor – rooms, lobbies and corridors – is converted into art galleries.

Singapore Editions

Worlds Apart Fair (First Edition) 
The inaugural edition of Worlds Apart Fair was held from 25 to 27 January 2013 in 40 rooms at Conrad Centennial Singapore, and saw more than 3,000 visitors and buyers. The fair showcased some 3,400 art works, ranging from paintings and photography to video art, sculptures and installations.

Worlds Apart Fair featured emerging contemporary artists from Asia, Africa, Lebanon, Europe, the Americas and Australia, with a greater focus on rising artists from Singapore. Some of the galleries that exhibited in clude Vertical Submarine (Singapore), Villa Del Arte Galleries (Spain) and Art Bridge Contemporary (Korea).

Two Chinese talents, Singaporean actor Qi Yuwu and renowned Chinese artist Feng Zhengjie collaborated for the first time specially for this fair and presented their work 'Showcase on Print'.

Art Apart Fair (Second Edition) 
Worlds Apart was renamed as Art Apart as part of a series of "Apart Fairs".

The second edition of Art Apart was held from 5 to 7 July 2013 at Parkroyal on Pickering, and featured over 120 Asian artists and galleries. The art works were focused on Korea and revolved around themes such as "Korean Wave", "Asian Spirit" and "Butterfly Effect".

In addition to the display of artworks, the fair included talks by prominent artists and industry experts from around Asia.

About 3,000 visitors attended Art Apart Fair 2nd Edition.

Art Apart Fair (Third Edition) 
The third edition of Art Apart took place from 17 to 19 January 2014, showcased more than 1,500 art pieces from 12 countries, including Germany, South Korea, Russia and the Philippines.

Besides housing exhibitions such as "The Destruction of the Readymade Everyday", the main theme for Art Apart 3rd Edition was "The Artists' Garden" – a selection of 100 art pieces from the 33 participating galleries.

Over 4,000 people visited the art fair, an increase from the 2nd Edition.

Art Apart Fair (Fourth Edition) 
The fourth edition of Art Apart was held from 18 to 20 July 2014, where more than 2,000 art pieces were exhibited, with a focus on works by Russian artists. The aim of the event was to introduce Eastern European Art, such as works from Moscow, Kazakhstan, Croatia and Slovenia.

Apart from the display of art pieces, there were live paintings of portraits, talks by Russian art experts and Russian Art Performance.

Similar to the previous edition, over 4,000 visitors visited Art Apart 4th Edition.

Art Apart Fair (Fifth Edition) 
The fifth edition of Art Apart was held from 23 to 25 January 2015 at Parkroyal on Pickering. Unlike past editions where the curations were focused on specific countries, such as Singapore, Korea and Russia, this edition showcased contemporary art, highlighted conceptual art works and urban art works by street artists from all around the world. Some of the featured artists include emerging Russian artists Rinat Voligamsi and Maxim Bashev, German artist Kaja el Attar and French artist Bruno Tanquerel.

Eight galleries from the previous editions of Art Apart made a return, such as Utterly Art, Gaze Gallery and Seoul Arts Centre.

Over 4,000 visitors attended the fifth edition of the art fair.

Art Apart Fair (Sixth Edition) 

The sixth edition of Art Apart was held from 17 to 19 July 2015. Art Apart Fair featured artworks from the Philippines. The finest Filipino galleries including Big and Small, Gallery Qube, Art Quartel and more showcased the best of contemporary Filipino artworks. Leading the pack of Filipino artists was glass artist Ramon Orlina, who showcased pieces from his stellar three decades in the industry. The art works of Ronald Ventura, the auctions record-holder for Southeast Asian paintings, as well as Geraldine Javier, Marina Cruz, Randy Salon and more were present at the sixth edition.

Art Apart Fair (Seventh Edition) 
The seventh edition of Art Apart will be held from 22 to 24 January 2016. Art Apart Fair will see the participation of more than 40 Singaporean artists alongside others hailing from Malaysia, Thailand, Korea, Iceland, America, Philippines, Russia and France. The Fair is possibly the largest ensemble of fresh, emerging Singaporean artists in an art fair and signals a shift in focus from previous editions that focused on a matrix of foreign artists and art genre. The Presidential Suite will be themed "Mosaic" and feature never-before-seen works of Benny Ong, Daniela Beltrani's curated selection of 12 Singapore-based artworks and Rosalind Lim's selection of designers-turned-artists, Hayden Ng and luxury shoe designer Mashizan Masjum. Author Bryan Koh will also be presenting his books at the Fair.

Overseas Editions 
Unlike the Singapore Editions, where the fairs are conducted biannually, the fairs held overseas – more specifically London and New York – will take place biennially.

Art Apart London (First Edition) 
Art Apart made its international debut from 17 to 19 October 2014 at the Town Hall Hotel, in Bethnal Green, East London. The show is believed to be the first hotel art fair that took place in London in a larger scale. The fair showcased over 2,000 contemporary works from more than 100 rising and mid-career artists, including artists such as Oscar Lett, Russell Marshall and Nikolai Ishchuk, occupying the entire second floor of the hotel. Besides featuring artists, art pieces by silversmiths, jewellers and makers, such as Hans Stofer and David Clarke were exhibited as well. Over 3,000 visitors were expected to be present for the Art Apart London 1st Edition.

Art Apart New York (First Edition) 
Art Apart is expected to debut in New York in March 2016.

Art Apart London (Second Edition) 
The second edition of Art Apart in London is expected to be held in October 2016.

References 

Art fairs
Art websites
Arts in London
Arts in Singapore
Contemporary art exhibitions
Entertainment events in Singapore
Events in Singapore
Online databases
Recurring events established in 2013
Singaporean culture
Tourist attractions in Singapore